Is There Anybody Out There? is the debut album from American pop duo A Great Big World. Its single "Say Something" achieved considerable success after Christina Aguilera heard the song, decided to collaborate and a re-recorded version was released.

Critical reception

The reception to the album has been mixed. Timothy Monger of AllMusic thought that the duo Ian Axel and Chad King tackled "some classic pop territory with a wide-eyed sincerity that is ultimately appealing if occasionally trite," that the production is "concise and full of punch," but there are moments that could "benefit from some subtlety." Jason Lipschutz of Billboard said that the album is "as uniformly earnest as the sombre lead" single "Say Something," but also has songs that offered "quirky optimism and snappy tempo."  Glenn Gamboa of Newsday found the album filled with surprises and thought it musically and lyrically "eclectic."  He judged the duo to have approached the album "with such passion and joyfulness on "Is There Anyone Out There?" (sic) that you end up going along for the wild ride and enjoying it." Elysa Gardner of USA Today was equally positive and thought the tunes in the album "smartly crafted," the singing of the duo blended "seamlessly," and that their more driving tracks "establish this pair as pop contenders."

Among the more negative reviews, Jim Farber of New York Daily News castigated the album, calling it the "latest, and clumsiest, example" of "the geekiest elements of modern show tunes into the musical mainstream," one that "pivots on the kind of reedy, sexually unsure, and over-articulated vocals that scream 'bad Broadway.'" Jon Caramanica of the New York Times considered the album to be "gentle and plain-spoken and free of any artifice," but also "dull" and "painfully executed." He also found Axel's voice to be "grating," have "no color" and to be "almost digital in its simplicity."

Commercial performance
The album debuted on the Billboard 200 at No. 3 with sales of 48,000. It dropped to No. 33 the following week with sale of 11,000. The album has sold 165,000 copies as of October 2015.

Singles
 "This Is the New Year" (released May 21, 2013)
 "Say Something" (September 3, 2013)
 "I Really Want It" (promotional single; December 10, 2013) and (May 2, 2014 released as a single)
 "Rockstar" (promotional single; March 3, 2014)
 "Already Home" (radio single; April 2014)

Track listing

Personnel

A Great Big World
Ian Axel- piano, synthesizer, percussion, lead vocals
Chad King- acoustic guitar, triangle, trumpet, lead vocals, background vocals

Additional Musicians
Christina Aguilera- duet vocals on track 13
Chris Anderson- bass guitar
Mike Campbell- acoustic guitar
Andrew Duckles- viola
Vanessa Freebairn-Smith- cello
Rich Hinman- electric guitar
Sean Hurley- bass guitar
Elliot Jacobson- drums
Zach Jones- drums, percussion
Chris Kuffner- acoustic guitar, electric guitar
Pete McNeal- drums
Matt Musselman- trombone
Zac Rae- keyboards
Mark Robertson- violin
Oscar Albis Rodriguez- electric guitar
Dan Romer- bass guitar, acoustic guitar, electric guitar, organ, percussion, string arrangements

Charts

Weekly charts

Year-end charts

Release history

References 

2014 debut albums
A Great Big World albums
Albums produced by John Alagía